LA-33 is a constituency of Azad Kashmir Legislative Assembly which is currently represented by Deewan Ali Khan Chughtai of Pakistan Tehreek-e-Insaf. It covers some parts of Hattian Bala in Hattian Bala District and also some parts of Muzaffarabad District of Azad Kashmir, Pakistan.

Election 2016

elections were held in this constituency on 21 July 2016.

Election 2021 
Further Information: Azad Kashmir Election 2021

Deewan Ali Khan Chughtai of Pakistan Tehreek-e-Insaf own the seat by getting 26474 votes. He defeated the incumbent Prime Minister of Azad Kashmir Raja Muhammad Farooq Haider Khan by a margin of 12,090 votes.

Muzaffarabad District
Azad Kashmir Legislative Assembly constituencies